Societas Liturgica is the international ecumenical society for the study of Christian liturgy and worship. Societas Liturgica has around 300 members who are researchers, academics or practitioners.

The Societas meets biennially most recently in 2019 in Durham

Notable members 
Louis Weil

References

External links 

Studia Liturgica

Christian ecumenical organizations
Organizations with year of establishment missing